Professional Bowling tournaments -- New Orleans played host to PBA Tour events in 1963, 1964, 1966-1978 and 1988-1990. A PBA Tour sponsored exhibition tournament took place in 2009 and 2010.

References

External links
Professional Bowlers Association (PBA) homepage

New Orleans, Louisiana
Bowling